The London Borough of Barnet, located on the northern periphery of London and having much of the area within its boundaries in the Metropolitan Green Belt, has many parks and open spaces. In addition there are large areas taken over by cemeteries and golf courses, and part of Hampstead Heath.

Parks

Premier Parks
Barnet describes its 16 main open spaces as 'premier parks', seven of which achieved a Green Flag Award for 2009/10:
 Childs Hill Park and Basing Hill Park, Childs Hill
 Cherry Tree Wood, East Finchley
 Edgwarebury Park, Edgware
 Friary Park, Friern Barnet
 Hendon Park, Hendon
 Lyttelton Playing Fields, Hampstead Garden Suburb
 Mill Hill Park, Mill Hill
 Oak Hill Park, East Barnet
 Old Court House Recreation Ground, High Barnet
 Sunny Hill Park, Hendon
 Swan Lane Open Space, Whetstone
 Tudor Sports Ground, New Barnet
 Victoria Park, Finchley Central
 Victoria Recreation Ground, New Barnet
 Watling Park, Burnt Oak
 West Hendon Playing Fields, West Hendon

Other Parks and Green Spaces
The borough contains over 200 green spaces. Some of them are:
 Bethune Park, Friern Barnet
 Bittacy Hill Park, Mill Hill
 Brent Park, Hendon
 Highlands Gardens, New Barnet
 Long Lane Pasture, Finchley
 Whitings Hill Open Space, Chipping Barnet

Nature Reserves

Site of Special Scientific Interest
 Brent Reservoir (a Site of Special Scientific Interest which is partly in the London Borough of Brent)

Local Nature Reserves
Barent has 7 Local Nature Reserves
 Big Wood and Little Wood, Hampstead Garden Suburb
 Oak Hill Wood, East Barnet
 Scratchwood and Moat Mount open space, Mill Hill
 Coppetts Wood and Glebelands, Colney Hatch
 Rowley Green Common, Arkley
 Totteridge Fields, Totteridge
 Brent Reservoir is a Local Nature Reserve as well as a Site of Special Scientific Interest

Sites of Nature Conservation Interest
The Borough has 67 Sites of Importance for Nature Conservation, and these are listed in Nature reserves in Barnet. Some of them are: 
 Hampstead Heath (only the Hampstead Heath Extension and Golders Hill Park are in Barnet)
 Arrandene Open Space and Featherstone Hill, Mill Hill
 Darland's Lake Nature Reserve, Totteridge
 Golders Hill Park, Golders Green
 King George's Fields, Monken Hadley
 The Mill Field, Mill Hill
 Monken Hadley Common, Monken Hadley
 Stoneyfields Park, Edgware

Dollis Valley Greenwalk
The Dollis Valley Greenwalk, in Barnet is one of 11 green spaces throughout Greater London chosen to receive money for redevelopment by a public vote. The walk received £400,000 towards a variety of improvements, including better footpaths, and more lighting. It follows Dollis Brook, which is also Site of Importance for Nature Conservation.

See also
Nature reserves in Barnet
East Finchley Cemetery
St. Pancras and Islington Cemetery

References

External links
List of premier parks on the London Borough of Barnet's website

List of sports facilities in Barnet parks
List of parks and open spaces in Barnet on the London Parks & Gardens Trust's London Gardens Online
Finchley Society, Finchley and Friern Barnet Green Spaces List